Daniel Jay Millman (born February 22, 1946) is an American author and lecturer in the personal development field. He is best-known for the movie Peaceful Warrior, which is based on his own life and taken from one of his books.

Early life
Millman was born in Los Angeles, California, to Herman and Vivian Millman (both deceased), and he has an older sister Diane. Much of his early life included active pursuits such as modern dance and martial arts, and then trampoline, tumbling, and gymnastics. He attended John Marshall High School in Los Angeles, where he was recognized along with another student as a Co-Senior Athlete of the Year.

During his senior year in high school, he won the United States Gymnastics Federation (USGF) national title on the trampoline, and while a freshman at U.C. Berkeley, he won the 1964 Trampoline World Championships in London and earned All-American honors and won an NCAA Championship in vaulting. In 1966 he won the USGF championship in floor exercise. 

He represented the United States in the 1965 Maccabiah Games, winning four gold medals in Gymnastics.

In September 1966, just prior to his senior year at U.C. Berkeley, Millman's motorcycle collided with a car. He suffered a shattered right femur, requiring surgical repair and bone marrow transplant with a steel nail inserted in his femur (which was removed a year later after the leg was healed). Millman actively pursued rehabilitation and was able to return to gymnastics as co-captain of his team which won the 1968 NCAA Gymnastics Championships in Tucson, Arizona. He was the last man to perform for U.C. on the high bar, and had a best-ever routine and perfect landing that clinched the team title.

In 1968 he was voted Senior U.C. Berkeley Athlete of the Year, and graduated with a B.A. degree in Psychology.

Career
In 1968, Millman served as director of gymnastics at Stanford University, where he coached U.S. Olympian Steve Hug and brought the Stanford team to national prominence. During Millman's tenure at Stanford, he trained in Aikido, eventually earning a shodan (black belt) ranking, and studied T'ai chi (Taiji) and other martial arts.

In 1972, at the invitation of the sports activist Jack Scott, Millman joined a program of athletic reform at Oberlin College in Oberlin, Ohio as an assistant professor of physical education. At Oberlin, on a travel-research grant from the college, Millman traveled to San Francisco, where he completed the Arica 40-Day Intensive Training, then to Hawaii, India, Hong Kong, and Japan, where he studied various disciplines including yoga and martial arts.

In 1985, Millman began to produce audio and video programs, and to present seminars and professional keynotes. His work is generally connected to the "human potential movement".

Millman has authored 17 books as of 2015 which together have been published in 29 languages.  In 2006, his first book, Way of the Peaceful Warrior, was adapted to a film, Peaceful Warrior, with Nick Nolte, distributed by Lionsgate Films and re-released by Universal Pictures in 2007. Dan credits the inspiration for his first book to a gas station attendant he met who reminded him of Socrates and to whom he gave that name.

Personal life
Dan Millman and his wife Joy live in  San Rafael, California. They have three grown daughters.

Works
Works by Millman include the following:

 1979: Whole Body Fitness
 1980: Way of the Peaceful Warrior: A Book That Changes Lives
 1985: The Warrior Athlete (revised edition of Whole Body Fitness)
 1990: Sacred Journey of the Peaceful Warrior
 1991: Secret of the Peaceful Warrior (for children, illustrated by Taylor Bruce)
 1992: No Ordinary Moments: A Peaceful Warrior's Guide to Daily Life
 1993: Quest for the Crystal Castle (for children, illustrated by Taylor Bruce)
 1994: The Life You Were Born to Live: A Guide to Finding Your Life Purpose
 1995: The Laws of Spirit: A Tale of Transformation
 1998: Everyday Enlightenment: The Twelve Gateways to Personal Growth
 1999: Body Mind Mastery (revised edition of The Warrior Athlete)
 2000: Living on Purpose: Straight Answers to Life's Tough Questions
 2006: The Journeys of Socrates: The Way Begins
 2007: Wisdom of the Peaceful Warrior: A Companion to the Book that Changes Lives
 2009: Bridge Between Worlds: Extraordinary Experiences that Changed Lives (with co-author Doug Childers)
 2010: Peaceful Warrior: The Graphic Novel (illustrated by Andrew Winegarner)
 2011: The Four Purposes of Life: Finding Meaning and Direction in a Changing World
 2013: The Creative Compass: Writing Your Way from Inspiration to Publication (with co-author Sierra Prasada)
 2017: The Hidden School: Return of the Peaceful Warrior
 2022: Peaceful Heart, Warrior Spirit: The True Story of my Spiritual Quest

References

External links

The Peaceful Warrior's Way – Dan Millman's personal website.

Interviews
Dan Millman – Video Interview with Conscious Media Network
Interview with Spiritual Endeavors discusses training philosophy, fiction in book
Working and Living Life Smarter Conference – keynoted by Dan Millman (November 2006)
Dan Millman Discusses his Book The Hidden School - Audio Interview with Roger Nichols of Modern Signed Books

1946 births
Living people
American motivational speakers
American motivational writers
American self-help writers
American spiritual writers
American male trampolinists
California Golden Bears men's gymnasts
Stanford Cardinal men's gymnastics coaches
Writers from San Rafael, California
Relationship education
Competitors at the 1965 Maccabiah Games
Maccabiah Games gold medalists for the United States
Maccabiah Games medalists in gymnastics
21st-century American Jews